William Perley Annis  (May 24, 1857– June 10, 1923) was a 19th-century Major League Baseball outfielder. He played for the 1884 Boston Beaneaters. He continued to play baseball in the minor leagues through 1892.

Career
Annis made his professional baseball debut in 1883, playing for the Pottsville Antharcites of the Interstate Association.

In 1884, he played for both the Boston Reserves of the Massachusetts State Association and the Boston Beaneaters of the National League. He played in 27 games as an outfielder for the Beaneaters, collecting 17 hits in 96 at bats. Annis finished with a .177 batting average.

Annis played for several minor league teams from 1885 to 1892.

Personal life
He was the son of Perley Mason Annis, a shoe maker, and Rozilla E. Coburn. He was married twice, and had no children.

He died on June 10, 1923, and was buried at Lindenwood Cemetery in Stoneham, Massachusetts.

References

External links

1857 births
1923 deaths
19th-century baseball players
Major League Baseball outfielders
Boston Beaneaters players
Pottsville Antarcites players
Newark Little Giants players
Omaha Omahogs players
Omaha Lambs players
Worcester Grays players
New Haven Nutmegs players
Providence Clamdiggers (baseball) players
Baseball players from Massachusetts